Alison Kosik (born April 28, 1971) is an American journalist and was a former CNN business correspondent who covered the New York Stock Exchange.

Biography
Kosik was born in Miami, Florida, the daughter of Brenda (née Seinfeld) and Gilbert Kosik. She attended Nova High School and graduated with a B.A. in Broadcast Journalism and Political Science from American University in Washington, D.C.

She began her career in Corpus Christi, Texas working as a reporter for KZTV-TV and KRIS-TV and then moved to West Palm Beach, Florida where she worked as a reporter and fill-in anchor for WPEC-TV/WFLX-TV. She then moved to Washington D.C. where she worked first as a business correspondent for EnergyNewsLive.com covering the energy sector; then as a reporter and anchor for the Sinclair Broadcast Group; and then as a reporter for Hearst-Argyle Television. She then accepted a position as an investigative reporter at WCBS-TV in New York City. She presently works as a  business correspondent for CNN covering the New York Stock Exchange. During a wave of layoffs at the end of 2022, it was announced that Kosik would be among those leaving CNN. On March 2, 2023, after 15 years of working with CNN, she posted on her Instagram on her last day of her job. 

Kosik received a Scripps Howard New Media Fellowship from Columbia University in 2001, and in 1999 received a 1999 Florida AP Award for Best Spot News. She was a 1993 Fellow of the International Radio and Television Society.

References

External links
 

1971 births
American investigative journalists
American television reporters and correspondents
CNN people
Living people
People from Davie, Florida
Nova High School alumni
American University School of Communication alumni
American women television journalists
21st-century American women